V.92 is an ITU-T recommendation, titled Enhancements to Recommendation V.90, that establishes a modem standard allowing near 56 kb/s download and 48 kb/s upload rates. With V.92 PCM is used for both the upstream and downstream connections; previously 56K modems only used PCM for downstream data.

New features

Quick connect

This reduces negotiation times to around 10 seconds instead of over 20 seconds.  Quick connect works by training the client modem on the first call; analog and digital characteristics are stored in a local profile and then retrieved for future connections.

Modem on hold (MOH)

This allows the connection to be temporarily severed and then reconnected, reducing the possibility of dropped connections. This is particularly useful for lines that have call waiting.

PCM upstream

Pulse-code modulation (or PCM) allows higher rate digital transmissions over the analog phone lines.  PCM upstream provides a digital connection for upstream data, reducing latency and allowing for a maximum upload speed of 48 kbit/s. Previously the speed was limited to a 33.6 kbit/s analog signal under the previous V.90.

V.44 compression

V.44 compression replaces the existing V.42bis compression standards.  It generally allows for between 10% and 120% better compression.  In most situations the improvement is around 25%.

See also 

 Dial-up Internet access
 List of device bandwidths

External links
 ITU-T Recommendation V.92: Enhancements to Recommendation V.90
 ITU-T Recommendations: Series V

Modems
Telecommunications-related introductions in 2001
Telecommunication protocols
ITU-T V Series Recommendations